Borris is a civil parish in the barony of Maryborough East in County Leix.

Its 24 townlands are:

Aghnaharna (also called Summerhill)
Ballytegan
Beladd
Borris Great
Borris Little
Clonminan
Clonreher
Clonsoghey
Cooltoran
Curriersbog
Downs
Gorteen
Knockmay
Knocknagroagh
Kyleclonhobert
Kylekiproe
Kyletalesha
Maryborough
Meelick
Moneyballytyrrell
Ratheven
Rathnamanagh
Rossleaghan
Summerhill—see Aghnaharna
Togher

References

Civil parishes of County Laois